Tareq Al-Ghareeb (born 25 July 1961) is a Kuwaiti judoka. He competed in the men's half-heavyweight event at the 1984 Summer Olympics. As well as competed and won a bronze medal at the 1986 judo Asian olympics.

References

1961 births
Living people
Kuwaiti male judoka
Olympic judoka of Kuwait
Judoka at the 1984 Summer Olympics
Place of birth missing (living people)
Asian Games medalists in judo
Judoka at the 1986 Asian Games
Asian Games bronze medalists for Kuwait
Medalists at the 1986 Asian Games
21st-century Kuwaiti people
20th-century Kuwaiti people